Galaxian is the fifth album by keyboardist Jeff Lorber as leader of his band "The Jeff Lorber Fusion". Released in 1981, this was Lorber's last album as leader of his band "The Jeff Lorber Fusion" until 2010's Now Is The Time.

Track listing
All songs composed by Jeff Lorber, except where noted.

"Monster Man" (Lorber, Stanley Clarke) - 3:29
"Seventh Mountain" (Lorber, Tom Grant) - 5:20
"Magic Lady" - 4:43 	
"Night Love" - 5:10 	
"Spur of the Moment" (Lorber, Kenny G, Danny Wilson) - 4:13 	
"Think Back and Remember" - 4:18 	
"Bright Sky" - 4:16 	
"Galaxian" - 4:22

Personnel 
 Jeff Lorber – acoustic piano, Fender Rhodes, electric grand piano, Prophet-10, Oberheim 8 Voice, Moog Modular System, Minimoog
 Marlon McClain – guitars (1, 5, 6, 8), guitar solo (8)
 Dean Parks – guitars (2, 3, 4, 7, 8), guitar solo (2)
 Stanley Clarke – bass, bass solo (1)
 Danny Wilson – bass 
 Dennis Bradford – drums
 Paulinho da Costa – percussion
 Kenny Gorelick – saxophones, flute
 Kim Hutchcroft – horns
 Larry Williams – horns
 Jerry Hey – horns
 Donny Gerrard – vocals (1, 6)
 George Johnson – arrangements (6)

Production 
 Jeff Lorber – producer 
 Rik Pekkonen – producer, engineer, mixing 
 Bernie Grundman – mastering at  Bernie Grundman Mastering (Hollywood, California).
 Ria Lewerke-Shapiro – art direction, design 
 Douglas Kirkland – front cover photography 
 Aaron Rapoport – back cover photography 
 Sue Reilly – lettering 
 Jeffrey Ross Music – management

Charts

References

External links
 Jeff Lorber-Galaxian at Discogs

1981 albums
Jeff Lorber albums
Arista Records albums